Rock 'N' America is an American sketch comedy and music video show.

In most markets that syndicated the program, it was usually aired Friday or Saturday evenings, usually at midnight or later.  During Smith's run as host, much of the show's humor revolved around cheese logs and other stereotypes parodying the 1980s club lounge scene.  One of the comedy bits featured Smith anchoring a fake newscast, in the style of a Saturday Night Live Weekend Update segment, using the sobriquet "Walter Cheeselog".

In the middle of the series run, the original series host Rick Ducommun was replaced by Frazer Smith.  The opening and ending credit music changed also, using a portion of the song "Automatic Sighs" (falsely credited as "Automatic Signs" during the end credits) by the band Strange Advance off their album Worlds Away.

References

External links

1980s American sketch comedy television series
1980s American satirical television series
1980s American musical comedy television series
1984 American television series debuts
1985 American television series endings
English-language television shows